Scotorythra is a genus of moths in the family Geometridae erected by Arthur Gardiner Butler in 1883. All species of this genus are endemic to Hawaii.

Species
Scotorythra anagraptis Meyrick, 1899
Scotorythra apicalis Swezey, 1948
Scotorythra arboricolans Butler, 1883
Scotorythra artemidora Meyrick, 1899
Scotorythra brunnea (Warren, 1896)
Scotorythra capnopa Meyrick, 1899
Scotorythra caryopis Meyrick, 1899
Scotorythra corticea (Butler, 1881)
Scotorythra crocorrhoa Meyrick, 1928
Scotorythra demetrias Meyrick, 1899
Scotorythra diceraunia Meyrick, 1900
Scotorythra dissotis Meyrick, 1904
Scotorythra epicyma Meyrick, 1899
Scotorythra epixantha (Perkins, 1901)
Scotorythra euryphaea Meyrick, 1899
Scotorythra gomphias (Meyrick, 1899)
Scotorythra goniastis Meyrick, 1899
Scotorythra hecataea Meyrick, 1899
Scotorythra hyparcha Meyrick, 1899
Scotorythra kuschei Swezey, 1940
Scotorythra leptias Meyrick, 1904
Scotorythra macrosoma Meyrick, 1899
Scotorythra megalophylla Meyrick, 1899
Scotorythra metacrossa Meyrick, 1904
Scotorythra nephelosticta Meyrick, 1899
Scotorythra nesiotes (Perkins, 1901)
Scotorythra ochetias (Meyrick, 1899)
Scotorythra ortharcha Meyrick, 1899
Scotorythra oxyphractis Meyrick, 1899
Scotorythra pachyspila Meyrick, 1899
Scotorythra paludicola (Butler, 1879)
Scotorythra paratactis Meyrick, 1904
Scotorythra platycapna Meyrick, 1899
Scotorythra rara (Butler, 1879)
Scotorythra trachyopis Meyrick, 1899
Scotorythra trapezias Meyrick, 1899
Scotorythra triscia Meyrick, 1899

The following species are believed to be extinct:
 Kona giant looper moth (Scotorythra megalophylla)
 Koʻolau giant looper moth (Scotorythra nesiotes)
 Hawaiian hopseed looper moth (Scotorythra paratactis)

References

 
Boarmiini
Geometridae genera
Taxonomy articles created by Polbot
Taxa named by Arthur Gardiner Butler